Roman Catholic Brahmin (IAST Bamonns  in Romi Konkani, ಬಾಮಣು in Canara Konkani& Kupari in Bombay East Indian dialects) is a caste among the Goan, Bombay East Indian and Mangalorean Catholics who are patrilineal descendants of Konkani Brahmin converts to the Latin Catholic Church, in parts of the Konkan region that were annexed into the Portuguese East Indies, with the capital (metropole) at Velha Goa, while Bombay (Bom Bahia) was the largest territory (province). They retain some of the ethno-social values and customs of their ancestors, and most of them exhibit a noticeable hybrid Latino-Concanic culture. They were known as the Brahmins among the "New Christians".

Origins
In Goa, the Brahmins were engaged in the priestly occupation, but had also taken up various occupations like agriculture, trade, goldsmith, etc. The origins of this particular caste can be traced back to the Christianisation of the Velhas Conquistas that was undertaken by the Portuguese during the 16th and 17th centuries. It was during this period that the Jesuit, Franciscan and Dominican missionaries converted many Brahmins to Christianity. The first mass conversions took place among the Brahmins of Divar, and the Kshatriyas of Carambolim.

All converts from Brahmin sub-castes (Gowd Saraswat Brahmin, Daivadnya Brahmin, etc) were unified into a single Christian caste of Bamonn. Since the conversions of Brahmins of a particular area became instrumental in the conversions of members of other castes because it resulted in loss of temple priests, such converts were highly valued and esteemed by the church and Portuguese authorities alike. They were even allowed to wear the Yajnopavita (sacred threads) and other caste markings by a special dispensation of Pope Gregory XV in 1623, on the condition that these were to be blessed by a Catholic priest.

The Bamonns in general, consider their Indian caste system to be a class form of social categorisation. Since their concept is divorced from all the religious elements associated to it by their Hindu counterparts, they tend to justify their maintenance of caste as a form of social stratification similar to the Western class concept. They are an endogamous group and have generally refrained from inter-marriage with Catholics of other castes. However, while the Bamonns never inter-married or mingled with the lower castes, the statutes and norms of the Roman Catholic church restrained them from practising Hindu caste based discrimination against the latter. Although most now carry Portuguese surnames, they have retained knowledge about their ancestral pre-conversion surnames, such as Bhat, Kamat, Nayak, Pai, Prabhu, Shenoy, and Shet. The konkanised variants of these surnames are Bhôtt, Kāmot, Nāik, Poi, Porbų (Probų), Šeņai, and Šet.

Mudartha is a unique surname to be found among some Bamonn families that hail from Udipi district in Karnataka. There is also a population of Saarodi (Christian Cxatrias), but Bamonns constitute the largest caste in the Mangalorean Catholic community. Most Mangalorean Catholic Bamonn families trace their patrilineal descent to Goud Saraswat Brahmins. There were a few historical instances in the Mangalorean Catholic community, wherein some Protestant Anglo-Indians were admitted into the Bamonn fold by Catholic priests at the time of their conversion to Catholicism, their descendants are known as Pulputhru Bamonns (Pulpit Bamonns).

A 1976 genetic analysis study conducted on three groups of Saraswat Brahmins and one group of Goan Catholic Bamonns in Western India, confirmed the historical and ethnological evidence of a relationship between Goan Catholic Bamonns and Chitrapur Saraswat Brahmins. The study further revealed that intergroup differences between the subject groups suggested a genetic closeness, with genetic distance ranging from 0.8 to 1.5.

In popular culture
 In her poem entitled de Souza Prabhu, the Goan poet Eunice de Souza muses about her Bamonn heritage:

 The main protagonist of Mangalorean writer Richard Crasta’s erotic novel The Revised Kamasutra, is Vijay Prabhu, a small town, middle class Bamonn youth living in Mangalore during the 1970s. Filled with erotic longing and a deep desire to flee staunchly conservative Mangalore, he embarks on a sexual and spiritual odyssey that eventually lands him in the relatively liberal United States.
 The protagonists of Konkani novelist, V.J.P. Saldanha’s novels such as Balthazar from the novel, Belthangaddicho Balthazar (Balthazar of Belthangadi), Sardar Simaon and Sardar Anthon from Devache Kurpen (By the Grace of God), Salu and Dumga Peenth from Sordarachim Sinol (The sign of the Knights) are Bamonns. A few characters such as Jaculo Pai and Monna Kamath from Sordarachim Sinol, Sardar Simaon Pedru Prabhu, Sardar Anthon Paul Shet and Raphael Minguel Kamath from Devache Kurpen have evidently Brahmin surnames.
 Antonio Gomes' debut novel The Sting of Peppercorns (2010) focuses on the trials and tribulations faced by the de Albuquerques, a Bamonn family from Loutolim in Salcette. The family is headed by its patriarch Afonso de Albuquerque, a namesake of the conqueror of Goa to whom the family is linked through legend. Apart from him, it consists of his wife Dona Isabella, their two sons Paulo and Roberto, their daughter Amanda, an aunt Rosita noted for her cooking skills, ayah Carmina, and several servants who live on the de Albuquerque estate.
 Shakuntala Bharvani's novel Lost Directions (1996) features a minor Goan Bamonn character, Donna Bolvanta-Bragança. She is a fervent Catholic who takes pride in her Brahmin heritage, scornfully reprimanding the protagonist Sangeeta Chainani for mistaking her to be an Anglo-Indian. When Chainani innocently inquires as to how she can call herself a Brahmin while adhering to Roman Catholicism, her inquiry is contemptuously dismissed by the character.

Notable persons
Joseph da Cunha 
Gerson da Cunha
Sebastião Rodolfo Dalgado

Footnotes
 a  In his A Konkani grammar published in Mangalore by the Basel Printing Press in 1882, Italian Jesuit and Konkani philologist Angelus Francis Xavier Maffei stated that Mangalorean Catholic Bamonn families then were still referred to by their paik surnames. In the book, Maffei also gives a Konkani language grammar exercise:

See also

Christianisation of Goa
Christianity in India
Christianity in Goa
Christianity in Karnataka
Christianity in Maharashtra
Forward caste
Caste system among Indian Christians
Latin Church in India
Christianity in Pakistan
Padval
Konkani people
Koli Christian
Gauda and Kunbi
Roman Catholic Kshatriya

Citations

References

.

.

.

.

.
.
.

.
.
.
.

.

.

Further reading

.

External links 
 
 
 

Goan society
Mangalorean society
Christian communities of India
Social groups of Goa
Social groups of Karnataka
Social groups of Maharashtra